Leonard Charles Rowe (23 January 1938 – 1 April 2009) was an English cricketer and rugby union player.  In cricket, Rowe was a right-handed batsman.  He was born in Northampton, Northamptonshire.

Having played for the Northamptonshire Second XI since 1955, Rowe later undertook studies at Oxford University, where he made his first-class debut for Oxford University against Gloucestershire in 1958.  He made 4 further first-class appearances for the university in 1958, the last of which came against the touring New Zealanders.  Used as an opening batsman, Rowe had little success in his brief first-class career, scoring 61 runs at an average of 7.62, with a highest score of 35, made after he had been shifted to the middle order. During this time he also played rugby union for both Northampton Saints and Oxford University.

He later joined Durham, making his debut for the county in the 1963 Minor Counties Championship against Cumberland.  He played Minor counties cricket for Durham from 1963 to 1966, making 10 appearances in the Minor Counties Championship.  Outside cricket, Rowe worked as a teacher.  He taught English at Durham School, Ferryhill Comprehensive and Durham Johnston School, where he was head of English at the latter two.  He retired from teaching in 1994.  In later died at his home in Durham, County Durham on 1 April 2009, following a battle against cancer.  He was survived by his wife, Margaret, four sons and eleven grandchildren.

References

External links
Len Rowe at ESPNcricinfo
Len Rowe at CricketArchive

1938 births
2009 deaths
Cricketers from Northampton
English rugby union players
Northampton Saints players
Alumni of Lincoln College, Oxford
English cricketers
Oxford University cricketers
Durham cricketers
Schoolteachers from Northamptonshire
Deaths from cancer in England
Heads of schools in England
Rugby union players from Northampton